Gwalior House is the former residence of the Maharaja of Gwalior in Delhi. Located at Rajpur Road in Civil Lines, Delhi, Gwalior House was one of the six princely houses in Civil Lines including Jamnagar, Kolhapur, Nabha, Sirohi and Udaipur.

Maharaja Jivajirao Scindia of Gwalior stayed at 37 Rajpur Road, along with his mother. The house was later involved in an inheritance feud within the princely family. It is of modest size and can therefore not be considered a palace.

Old Delhi had only three: Dujana House, Loharu House and (old) Pataudi House. The princely palaces were influenced by French, Italian, Indo-Venetian Gothic, Saracenic, Rajput and Islamic styles of architecture.

Since Gwalior was a 21-gun salute princely state, a large plot was set aside next to the Kingsway, today Rajpath, for a palace to be constructed next to the Baroda House and Patiala House  However the princely family refused to be aligned in this city planning scheme by the British. The plot stood empty and was temporary used as the Prince's Park Mess.

References 

Royal residences in Delhi
History of Gwalior